Galthambarawa Grama Niladhari Division is a Grama Niladhari Division of the Thamankaduwa Divisional Secretariat of Polonnaruwa District of North Central Province, Sri Lanka. It has Grama Niladhari Division Code 178.

Satmahal Prasada, Hatadage, Polonnaruwa Vatadage and Nissanka Latha Mandapaya are located within, nearby or associated with Galthambarawa.

Galthambarawa is a surrounded by the Palugasdamana North, Nishshankamallapura, Palugasdamana South, Kuruppu Junction and Ethumalpitiya Grama Niladhari Divisions.

Demographics

Ethnicity 

The Galthambarawa Grama Niladhari Division has a Sinhalese majority (99.8%). In comparison, the Thamankaduwa Divisional Secretariat (which contains the Galthambarawa Grama Niladhari Division) has a Sinhalese majority (82.9%) and a significant Moor population (15.8%)

Religion 

The Galthambarawa Grama Niladhari Division has a Buddhist majority (98.9%). In comparison, the Thamankaduwa Divisional Secretariat (which contains the Galthambarawa Grama Niladhari Division) has a Buddhist majority (81.4%) and a significant Muslim population (16.0%)

Gallery

References 

Grama Niladhari Divisions of Thamankaduwa Divisional Secretariat